The Otherside is the second studio album and third overall album by American country artist Cam. It was released by RCA/Triple Tigers on October 30, 2020, five years after her previous album Untamed.

The album broadens Cam's musical stylings, with some tracks including electronic, R&B and soft rock elements paired with her trademark acoustic country pop. Songwriting collaborators on the record include Jack Antonoff and the late Avicii as well as Sam Smith and Harry Styles, who Cam toured with in 2017 and 2018 respectively.

Background
Cam released a song titled "Road to Happiness" that failed to chart, resulting in her parting ways with her record label Arista Nashville in 2018. On June 29, 2020, Cam subsequently signed a record deal with Triple Tigers in partnership with RCA Records who moved forward with plans to release The Otherside, with Cam citing the desire to move to a label who took greater care of their artists. In a statement, Triple Tigers executive Norbert Nix explained that "When I heard Cam's new music, I was moved and inspired. She has an identifiable, world class voice and her songs are crafted with experience, emotion and strength. She is at the apex of her creative journey and it's an honor to work with an artist of her caliber and to partner with our good friends at RCA Records New York to showcase her talents to the world."

Of the large gap between Untamed and The Otherside, Cam told Rolling Stone Country that the album had "been evolving slowly, but there was never a dramatic shift or a change in content... I just had more time to tinker." Of the album's sonic range, she explained that "What Tyler and Jeff and I set out to do was make a vocal album [that is] about me using all the colors I have to tell those stories."

Promotion

Singles
The first single from the album, "Diane" was released on October 27, 2017. Promotional single "Till There's Nothing Left" was released on February 13, 2020, followed by a second promotional track, "Redwood Tree", which was released on May 29, 2020.

The album's second (and first for Triple Tigers) official single "Classic" was released on July 17, 2020. "Till There's Nothing Left" was released on April 5, 2021 as the album's third official single.

Track listing

Personnel
Adapted from AllMusic.

Jack Antonoff – acoustic bass, drums, 12-string guitar, acoustic guitar, electric guitar, percussion, piano, background vocals
Chris Baldani – horns
Tim Berling – production ("The Otherside")
Jeff Bhasker – keyboards, programming, background vocals
David Campbell – conductor
Jon Castelli – keyboards
Glen Duncan – mandolin
Peter Dyer – percussion, piano
Ian Fitchuk – drums
Mark Hill – bass guitar
Tyler Johnson – bass guitar, drums, electric guitar, keyboards, organ, piano, programming, synthesizer, background vocals, Wurlitzer
Hillary Lindsey – background vocals
Nick Lobel – electric guitar, percussion, programming, background vocals
Tony Lucido – bass guitar
Lindsay Marias – background vocals
Pat Marsh – background vocals
Simon Mårtensson – acoustic guitar
Rob McNelley – electric guitar
Anders Mouridsen – dobro, acoustic guitar, electric guitar, piano
Ryan Nasci – bass guitar, programming
Camaron Ochs – acoustic guitar, lead vocals, background vocals
Leroy Powell – pedal steel guitar
Connor Rayne – drums, percussion
Mitch Rowland – drums, acoustic guitar, electric guitar, mallets
Justin Schipper – pedal steel guitar
Doug Showalter – acoustic guitar, electric guitar, programming, background vocals
Evan Smith – keyboards, saxophone
Harry Styles – whistle
Ulf Mickael Wahlgren – drums, percussion
Adam Weaver – background vocals

Charts

References

2020 albums
Cam (singer) albums
Albums produced by Jeff Bhasker
RCA Records albums
Thirty Tigers albums